The following is a complete list of 25 metropolitan areas in Texas, as defined by the United States Office of Management and Budget. The largest two are ranked among the top 10 metropolitan areas in the U.S. 

Some metropolitan areas contain metropolitan divisions. Two metropolitan divisions exist within the Dallas–Fort Worth–Arlington MSA. The term metropolitan division is used to refer to a county or group of counties within a metropolitan area that has a population core of at least 2.5 million. A metropolitan division often functions as a distinct social, economic, and cultural area within the larger region.

Metropolitan areas
The following table lists population figures for those metropolitan areas, in rank of population. Population figures are as of the 2019 U.S. census estimates.

See also
List of Texas micropolitan areas
List of Texas cities
Texas census statistical areas

References

 
Metropolitan areas
Lists of metropolitan areas in the United States